Mingalar Shi Tae A Yat is a Burmese comedy-drama television series. It aired on MNTV, from September 3, 2017 to March 25, 2018, on every Sunday at 19:20 for 30 episodes.

Cast
Myint Myat as Banyar
Aye Wutyi Thaung as Maw
Nay Dway as Toe Pwar
Nwe Darli Tun as Sabal
Aung Thu Lwin (Kelvin Kate) as Khin Moe

References

Burmese television series
Myanmar National TV original programming